All Dolled Up is a 1921 American silent comedy film directed by Rollin S. Sturgeon and starring Gladys Walton, Edward Hearn and Florence Turner.

Cast
 Gladys Walton as 	Maggie Quick
 Edward Hearn as James Montgomery Johnson
 Richard Norton as Percy Prack
 Florence Turner as 	Eva Bundy
 Helen Broneau as The Widow
 Fred Malatesta as Amilo Rodolpho
 Ruth Royce as Mademoiselle Scarpa
 John Goff as Eddie Bowman
 Frank Norcross as Mr. Shankley
 Muriel Godfrey Turner as Madame De Jercasse
 Lydia Yeamans as Landlady

References

Bibliography
 Munden, Kenneth White. The American Film Institute Catalog of Motion Pictures Produced in the United States, Part 1. University of California Press, 1997.

External links
 

1921 films
1921 comedy films
1920s English-language films
American silent feature films
Silent American comedy films
Films directed by Rollin S. Sturgeon
American black-and-white films
Universal Pictures films
1920s American films